Radio Classique is a French commercial radio station created in 1983 that broadcasts mainly classical music. Its programmes also contain segments of  economic and political news. As of 2015, it had 1.1 million listeners per day.

Radio Classique was launched in January 1983 by Pierre Amalou led by former producers of France Musique. At its inception, it appealed for contributions from its listeners who - in exchange for a subscription - received the detailed program of the station. It also broadcast a few commercials for partners who took part in sponsorship deals and was part of the Groupe Expansion.

In fall 2005, the station tried to break down barriers to classical music highlighting the benefits of listening to classical. The station then repositioned around the "rejuvenation" (its new slogan "Ressourcez-vous"), with a goal of making classical music more accessible: a more friendly tone, film music, music on demand, games, etc. The editorial policy that prevailed from the beginning of the station was significantly bent, on the one hand full dissemination of works gave way to the dissemination of excerpts of works (symphony movements, extracts from concerts ...), on the other hand the recruitment of media personalities or celebrities replaced the neutral and objective presentation in favour of facilitators actively customising music programmes.

Since 2007, Radio Classique is part of Groupe Les Echos, the media division of LVMH Moet Hennessy Louis Vuitton.

See also
Radio-Classique Montréal CJPX-FM
Radio-Classique Quebec CJSQ-FM

References

External links 

Classical music radio stations
LVMH brands
Radio stations established in 1983
1983 establishments in France